Suri-dong is neighbourhood of Gunpo, Gyeonggi Province, South Korea.

External links
 Suri-dong 

Neighbourhoods in Gunpo